Tangsa is a Unicode block containing characters for Lakhum Mossang's script for writing the Tangsa language of India and Myanmar.

History
The following Unicode-related documents record the purpose and process of defining specific characters in the Tangsa block:

References 

Unicode blocks